Burnham Hoyt  (February 3, 1887 – April 3, 1960) was a prominent mid-20th-century architect born in Denver, Colorado.

Early years 

Born in North Denver, Burnham Hoyt was the son of Lydia Tompkins Hoyt and Wallace Hoyt, a carriage designer who emigrated from New Brunswick, Canada. He is the younger brother of Denver Architect Merrill H. Hoyt.  He grew up in the house located at 2849 West 23rd Avenue Denver and would return to that residence later in life. Burnham graduated from Denver’s North High School in 1904 and apprenticed with the Denver architectural firm of Kidder and Wieger. In 1908, he left Denver to study at the Beaux-Arts Institute in New York City, where he won 6 Beaux-Arts design competitions and continued his professional training at the well-respected New York firm of George Post and Bertram Goodhue. While there, he designed the interior woodwork for New York City’s St. Bartholomew Church. After serving two years in the U.S. Army during World War I, where he designed camouflage in France, he returned to Denver in 1919 to join his brother Merrill and form the Denver architectural firm of M.H. and B. Hoyt, Architects.

Later years 
The Hoyt brother's firm prospered during the post war years and they designed numerous commercial, residential academic and religious buildings in Denver. Their buildings incorporated various historical styles, including English Gothic, Spanish Baroque, Greek Revival and Romanesque. In later years, Burnham would embrace Art Deco and the modernist International Style.

In 1926, Burnham returned to New York when he was commissioned by John D. Rockefeller to design the interior of Riverside Church.

He worked several years as a Professor of Architectural Criticism at New York University, and in 1930 he became the Dean of the School of Architecture.

On February 11, 1933, the Hoyt brothers' partnership ended suddenly when his brother Merrill died of a heart attack at age 52.

In 1936 at age 49, Burnham married interior designer Mildred Fuller and returned to Denver.He owned his own firm in Denver from 1933 to 1955. In 1953, he was elected to the National Academy of Design as an associate academician. He received an honorary doctorate from Denver University, the Civic Princeps Award from Regis College, and a fellowship for design in the American Institute of Architects.

Burnham Hoyt was diagnosed with Parkinson disease in the early 1950s and died at the home he designed for himself at 3130 East Exposition Ave. in Denver.

A number of his works are listed on the National Register of Historic Places.

Credited buildings (partial list) 

Source:

References

Architects from Denver
1887 births
1960 deaths
Fellows of the American Institute of Architects